The 13th Vietnam Film Festival was held from December 6 to December 9, 2001 in Vinh City, Nghệ An Province, Vietnam, with the slogan: "For an advanced Vietnam cinema imbued with national identity" (Vietnamese: "Vì một nền điện ảnh Việt Nam tiên tiến, đậm đà bản sắc dân tộc").

Event 
This year, in the Feature Film section, there is a fierce competition between the works of veteran directors and the next generation. In the end, 7 Golden Lotuses were awarded for the following categories: Feature Film (2 films), Direct-to-Video Feature Film (1 film), Documentary Film (2 films), Animated Film (2 films).

Participation 
There were 105 films in attendance at the Film Festival: 12 feature films, 22 direct-to-video feature films, 15 documentary feature, 42 direct-to-video documentary and 14 animated films. At the Documentary Feature section, there is just a competition between two units: The Central Documentary and Science Film Studio (DSF) and People's Army Cinema. In the Animatied film section, it is almost just an internal review conference for the Vietnam Animation Studio, the only unit in the country that still produces this type of film.

Activities 
The exchanges between artists and audiences in Vinh were very exciting. They were as enthusiastic as going to a sport. Especially in the exchange with students of Pedagogical University of Vinh, many students had to squeeze together to enter the hall and there were many questions sent to the artists.

Inadequacy 
Direct-to-video feature films outnumber feature films, making the festival feel like an expansive television festival. This is a situation that has continued since the 1990s and shows no sign of getting better. Most of the audience only remembers the feature films that are broadcast on television and the actors who act in TV series, because it has been a long time since many people have had the opportunity to watch a feature film.

Official Selection

Feature film 

Highlighted title indicates Golden Lotus winner.

Awards

Feature film

Direct-to-video

Documentary/Science film

Animated film

Notes

References 

Vietnam Film Festival
Vietnam Film Festival
Vietnam Film Festival
2001 in Vietnam